The third season of Full Metal Panic!, titled Full Metal Panic! Invisible Victory, is a Japanese anime television series directed by Katsuichi Nakayama and animated by Xebec. It is the fourth television series based on the Full Metal Panic! light novel series, based on volumes seven, eight and nine of the main series (Continuing On My Own, Burning One Man Force and Come Make My Day), with the surviving members of Mithril trying to recompose after suffering a critical attack from Amalgam, and Sousuke traveling around the world, looking for Chidori after she was kidnapped, while evading enemies sent to assassinate him. Volume 6 Dancing Very Merry Christmas is left unadapted by the anime and was instead made into an audio drama. 

The series aired from April 13, 2018 to July 18, 2018. The opening theme is "Even...if" and the ending theme is "yes", both performed by Tamaru Yamada with versions in Japanese (until episode 4) and English (from episode 5 to episode 11). For episode 12, the ending theme is "tomorrow" by Mikuni Shimokawa. The series is licensed for the North American and Australasian market by Funimation, and in the UK market by Anime Limited.


Episode list

References

2018 Japanese television seasons
Full Metal Panic!